This is a list of women writers who were born in the country of Georgia or whose writings are closely associated with that country.

A
Manana Antadze (born 1945), Georgian writer and translator

D
Aneta Dadeshkeliani (1872–1922), Georgian poet, educator and social reformer
Nino Dadeshkeliani (1890–1931), Georgian writer, politician

E
Nana Ekvtimishvili (born 1978), Georgian writer and film director
Anastasia Eristavi-Khoshtaria (1868–1951), Georgian novelist
Dominika Eristavi (1864–1929), writer, translator

G
Ekaterine Gabashvili (1851–1938), Georgian feminist novelist
Mariam Garikhuli (1883–1960), Georgian novelist, children's writer and actress
Naira Gelashvili (born 1947), Georgian novelist, activist

H
Nino Haratischwili (born 1983), Georgian novelist, playwright

J
Barbare Jorjadze (1833–1895), Georgian writer and women's rights advocate

K
Ana Kalandadze (1924–2008), influential Georgian poet 
Babilina Khositashvili (1884–1973), Georgian poet, feminist
Mariam Khutsurauli (born 1960),  Georgian poet and short story writer
Lali Kiknavelidze (born 1969), Georgian screenwriter and film director
Ana Kordzaia-Samadashvili (born 1968), Georgian novelist and literary journalist
Nestan Kvinikadze (born 1980), Georgian scriptwriter, dramatist

M
Manana Matiashvili (born 1978), Georgian poet, translator and journalist
Tamta Melashvili (born 1979), Georgian novelist and feminist 
Ekaterine Melikishvili (1854–1928), Georgian translator and children's writer
Kato Mikeladze (1878–1942), Georgian journalist, feminist and women's rights activist

O
Iza Orjonikidze (1938–2010), Georgian poet, politician

P
Tamri Pkhakadze (born 1957), Georgian novelist, children's writer

S
Nino Salia (1898–1992), Georgian émigré historian active in France
Irma Shiolashvili (born 1974), Georgian poet, translator and journalist

T
Nino Tkeshelashvili (1874–1956), Georgian children's literature author and suffragist
Ekaterine Togonidze (born 1981), Georgian journalist, novelist, activist 
Elena Topuridze (1922–2004), Georgian philosopher and non-fiction writer
Mariam Tsiklauri (born 1960), Georgian poet, children's author and translator
Anastasia Tumanishvili-Tsereteli (1849–1932), Georgian writer, educator and influential feminist

V
Elene Virsaladze (1911–1977), Georgian folklorist

See also
List of women writers

Georgian women writers, List of
Women writers from Georgia (country)
writers
Women in Georgia (country)